Owen Sound Platers was a Canadian junior ice hockey team based in Owen Sound, Ontario. The team played in the Ontario Hockey League from 1989 to 2000, then was sold to new owners who renamed the team the Owen Sound Attack.

History
In 1989 the Holody's moved the Guelph Platers to Owen Sound, Ontario, retaining the name "Platers", as the Holody family owned a local electroplating company. The team played home games in the J. D. McArthur Arena at the Bayshore Community Centre.

The city of Owen Sound would be a strong base for junior hockey with disproportionately high support from the smallest city in the OHL. The city had a two time Memorial Cup champion in the Owen Sound Greys in 1924 & 1927, and the Owen Sound Mercurys were a long-standing OHA Senior Hockey team and 1954 Allan Cup Champions.

Dave Siciliano coached the Platers to 39 wins in 68 games during the 1998–99 season, and a third-place finish in the Western Conference. In the playoffs, the Platers won the first round four games to one versus the Sault Ste. Marie Greyhounds, won the second round four games to two versus the Guelph Storm, then lost in the third round four games to one versus the London Knights. The 1998–99 season marked the first time which the Platers advanced to the third round of the playoffs during the franchise's history in Owen Sound.

Despite many mediocre seasons, support for the team has remained strong. When the Holody's decided to sell the team in 2000, several local Owen Sound business-people banded together to purchase the team. Owen Sound fans realized that losing the team would be a crisis for the city. After a bidding war and a summer-long legal battle with another suitor, the team remained in Owen Sound. The ownership group elected for a name change and came up with the "Owen Sound Attack".

Coaches
List of coaches with multiple seasons in parentheses.

1989–1991, Len McNamara (2)
1991–1992, Rick Tarasuk
1992–1993, Jerry Harrigan (3)
1995–1996, Ric Seiling, John Lovell
1996–1997, John Lovell (3)
1997–1998, John Lovell, Dave Siciliano
1998–1999, Dave Siciliano (3)
1999–2000, Dave Siciliano, Brian O'Leary

Players
Andrew Brunette won the 1992–93 Eddie Powers Memorial Trophy as the top scorer in the OHL with 62 Goals, 100 Assists and 162 Points. He also tied for the Canadian Hockey League's scoring lead. Brunette was selected by the Washington Capitals 174th overall in the 7th round of 1993 NHL Entry Draft.

Jamie Storr was the 1993–94 OHL Goaltender of the Year. Storr was the starting goalie for back-to-back World Junior Hockey Championship Gold medals in 1993 and 1994. In 1994 he was drafted 7th overall by the Los Angeles Kings.

Dan Snyder, a former captain of the Owen Sound Platers had his number 14 retired by the Owen Sound Attack in 2003. He is remembered in Owen Sound for his leadership on the ice, and off the ice. Snyder was twice voted his team's humanitarian of the year. The Ontario Hockey League renamed its Humanitarian of the Year award posthumously in honour of Dan Snyder, who died from injuries suffered in a vehicular accident with teammate Dany Heatley in 2003.

NHL alumni
Nineteen alumni of the Owen Sound Platers graduated to play in the National Hockey League (NHL).

Sean Avery
Andrew Brunette
Jeff Christian
Ryan Christie
Todd Hlushko
Greg Jacina
Brent Johnson
Jason MacDonald
Adam Mair
Kirk Maltby
Chris Minard
Wayne Primeau
Curtis Sanford
Dan Snyder
Jamie Storr
Scott Walker
Kevin Weekes
Sean Whyte
Joel Ward

Team records
Records listed for those achieved from 1989 to 2000.

Season-by-season results

Regular season

Playoffs
1989–90 Defeated Sudbury Wolves 4 games to 3 in first round. Lost to Niagara Falls Thunder 4 games to 1 in quarter-finals.
1990–91 Out of playoffs.
1991–92 Lost to London Knights 4 games to 1 in first round.
1992–93 Defeated Niagara Falls Thunder 4 games to 0 in first round. Lost to S.S. Marie Greyhounds 4 games to 0 in quarter-finals.
1993–94 Defeated Kitchener Rangers 4 games to 1 in division quarter-finals. Lost to Detroit Jr. Red Wings 4 games to 0 in division semi-finals.
1994–95 Defeated Niagara Falls Thunder 4 games to 2 in division quarter-finals. Lost to Guelph Storm 4 games to 0 in quarter-finals.
1995–96 Lost to Niagara Falls Thunder 4 games to 2 in division quarter-finals.
1996–97 Lost to Barrie Colts 4 games to 0 in division quarter-finals.
1997–98 Defeated Kitchener Rangers 4 games to 2 in division quarter-finals. Lost to Ottawa 67's 4 games to 1 in quarter-finals.
1998–99 Defeated S.S. Marie Greyhounds 4 games to 1 in conference quarter-finals. Defeated Guelph Storm 4 games to 2 in conference semi-finals. Lost to London Knights 4 games to 1 in conference finals.
1999–2000 Out of playoffs.

Uniforms and logos

The Owen Sound platers used the same logo as the Guelph Platers from 1989 to 1995 (inset right) only changing the name of the city. Owen Sound modernized its logo for the 1995–96 season (top of page), and used it until the team was sold in 2000. The team colours remained the same throughout; black, gold, red and white. The home uniforms for Owen Sound were white background with black, red and gold trim. The away uniforms were black background, with red, gold and white trim.

References

Defunct Ontario Hockey League teams
Sport in Owen Sound
1989 establishments in Ontario
2000 disestablishments in Ontario
Ice hockey clubs established in 1989
Ice hockey clubs disestablished in 2000